Tabebuia lapacho is a species of plant in the family Bignoniaceae. It is found in Argentina and Bolivia. It is threatened by habitat loss.

References

lapacho
Vulnerable plants
Taxonomy articles created by Polbot
Taxobox binomials not recognized by IUCN